Treveon Graham (born October 28, 1993) is an American professional basketball player for the Long Island Nets of the NBA G League. He played college basketball for the VCU Rams.

High school career
Graham played high school basketball at St. Mary's Ryken High School in Leonardtown, Maryland, where as a senior he was named to the Washington Post All-Met team for the Washington D.C. area after averaging 21.5 points and 12 rebounds per game.  Graham chose to play for coach Shaka Smart at VCU after also considering Boston College, Clemson, Cincinnati, Cleveland State and Northeastern.

College career
As a freshman at Virginia Commonwealth University, Graham became a part of the Rams' regular rotation and averaged 7.0 points and 3.2 rebounds per game.  Prior to the start of his sophomore season, he was chosen by Sports Illustrated as the most likely "breakout sophomore" in the nation, based on statistical analysis of his performance in limited minutes as a freshman.  Graham's performance did improve significantly in his second season, raising his averages to 15.1 points and 5.8 rebounds as a full-time starter.  His performance was good enough to earn him second team All-Atlantic 10 honors.

After his sophomore season, Graham was chosen for USA Basketball's entry to the 2013 Summer Universiade in Kazan, Russia.  He started 5 games for Team USA, averaging 9.4 points and 6.8 rebounds per game.

Prior to the 2013–14 season, Graham was named first team preseason All-Atlantic 10 as VCU was named the preseason favorite to win the league.  VCU entered the season ranked 14th in the preseason AP Poll.  The Rams scored a key early season road victory, beating 25th ranked Virginia on November 12 in Charlottesville, Virginia.  Graham led all scorers with 22 points, including the game-winning three-pointer with just over a second remaining.

As a senior in 2014–15, Graham averaged 16.2 points and 7.1 rebounds in 33 games. Despite being affected by a lingering ankle injury for large parts of the season, Graham helped VCU in many ways. He led VCU in scoring, rebounding, and three-pointers made. He was also their leading scorer during the A-10 tournament where VCU won their first conference tournament in the Atlantic 10 despite qualifying as the fifth seed.

During Graham's college career he averaged 13.4 points, 5.8 rebounds and 1.4 assists in 25.4 minutes per game.

Professional career

Idaho Stampede (2015–2016)
After going undrafted in the 2015 NBA draft, Graham joined the San Antonio Spurs for the 2015 NBA Summer League. On August 17, 2015, he signed with the Utah Jazz. However, he was later waived by the Jazz on October 20 after appearing in two preseason games. On November 1, he was acquired by the Idaho Stampede of the NBA Development League as an affiliate player of the Jazz. In 46 games for the Stampede in 2015–16, he averaged 15.7 points, 6.1 rebounds and 1.6 assists per game.

Charlotte Hornets (2016–2018)
In July 2016, Graham joined the Orlando Magic white team for the Orlando Summer League and the Utah Jazz for the Las Vegas Summer League. On July 26, 2016, he signed with the Charlotte Hornets. In his second game for the Hornets on November 7, 2016, Graham scored his first NBA points when he knocked down a three-pointer from the left wing during a 122–100 win over the Indiana Pacers. On April 10, 2017, he scored a career-high 14 points in an 89–79 loss to the Milwaukee Bucks. On June 29, 2018, the Hornets announced that they would decline a qualifying offer to Graham, making him a free agent.

Brooklyn Nets (2018–2019)
On July 30, 2018, Graham signed with the Brooklyn Nets. On the season, Graham appeared in 35 games, scoring 5.3 points per game. During the season, he was sidelined for two months with a hamstring injury. Graham did a rehab stint with the Long Island Nets before returning to Brooklyn.

Minnesota Timberwolves (2019–2020)
On July 7, 2019, Graham was sent to the Golden State Warriors as part of a trade package for Kevin Durant. The following day, Graham and Shabazz Napier were traded to the Minnesota Timberwolves in exchange for the draft rights to Lior Eliyahu.

Atlanta Hawks (2020)
On January 16, 2020, Graham, along with Jeff Teague, was traded to the Atlanta Hawks in exchange for Allen Crabbe.

Long Island Nets (2022–present)
On January 25, 2022, Graham was acquired off waivers by the Long Island Nets.

Career statistics

NBA

Regular season

|-
| style="text-align:left;"|
| style="text-align:left;"|Charlotte
| 27 || 1 || 7.0 || .475 || .600 || .667 || .8 || .2 || .2 || .0 || 2.1
|-
| style="text-align:left;"|
| style="text-align:left;"|Charlotte
| 63 || 2 || 16.7 || .434 || .412 || .695 || 1.9 || .9 || .5 || .0 || 4.3
|-
| style="text-align:left;"|
| style="text-align:left;"|Brooklyn
| 35 || 21 || 20.4 || .335 || .297 || .818 || 3.1 || 1.0 || .4 || .2 || 5.3
|-
| style="text-align:left;"|
| style="text-align:left;"|Minnesota
| 33 || 20 || 20.1 || .354 || .241 || .730 || 3.0 || .9 || .5 || .1 || 5.2
|-
| style="text-align:left;"|
| style="text-align:left;"|Atlanta
| 22 || 0 || 12.1 || .373 || .351 || .474 || 2.3 || .7 || .3 || .2 || 3.3
|- class="sortbottom"
| style="text-align:center;" colspan="2"|Career
| 180 || 44 || 16.0 || .383 || .333 || .691 || 2.2 || .8 || .4 || .1 || 4.2

Playoffs

|-
| style="text-align:left;"|2019
| style="text-align:left;"|Brooklyn
| 5 || 0 || 15.8 || .200 || .000 || .500 || 2.2 || .6 || .4 || .2 || 1.4

College

|-
| style="text-align:left;"|2011–12
| style="text-align:left;"|VCU
| 36 || 0 || 16.8 || .389 || .313 || .633 || 3.2 || .6 || .8 || .3 || 7.0
|-
| style="text-align:left;"|2012–13
| style="text-align:left;"|VCU
| 36 || 36 || 27.6 || .450 || .366 || .732 || 5.8 || 1.6 || .9 || .1 || 15.1
|-
| style="text-align:left;"|2013–14
| style="text-align:left;"|VCU
| 35 || 33 || 28.3 || .437 || .337 || .694 || 7.0 || 2.0 || .9 || .2 || 15.8
|-
| style="text-align:left;"|2014–15
| style="text-align:left;"|VCU
| 33 || 33 || 29.4 || .428 || .381 || .691 || 7.1 || 1.6 || .6 || .3 || 16.2
|- class="sortbottom"
| style="text-align:center;" colspan="2"|Career
| 140 || 102 || 25.4 || .432 || .354 || .691 || 5.8 || 1.4 || .8 || .2 || 13.4

References

External links

 VCU Rams bio

1993 births
Living people
African-American basketball players
American men's basketball players
Atlanta Hawks players
Basketball players from Maryland
Basketball players from Washington, D.C.
Brooklyn Nets players
Charlotte Hornets players
Idaho Stampede players
Long Island Nets players
Minnesota Timberwolves players
People from Temple Hills, Maryland
Shooting guards
Small forwards
Undrafted National Basketball Association players
VCU Rams men's basketball players
United States men's national basketball team players
21st-century African-American sportspeople